Baek Yoon-sik (born 16 March 1947) is a South Korean actor. He is known for his characteristic near-expressionless facial acting.

Career
Baek Yoon-sik made his debut in 1970 on KBS TV. In the coming years he would appear in four films, taking lead roles in his acting debut Excellent Guys and in romantic comedy Only with You with Seo Mi-kyung, a young star of the time. He also obtained his bachelor's degree and master's degree in Theater and Film at Chung-Ang University.

Nonetheless, his film career appeared to end in the 1970s and he became known thereafter as a TV actor. In the late 1990s and early 2000s he attained a certain degree of visibility in TV dramas such as The Moon of Seoul (1994, with Han Suk-kyu and Choi Min-sik) and Jang Hui-bin (2002, with Kim Hye-soo).

In 2003, however, Baek's career was revived in spectacular fashion with a major role in Jang Joon-hwan's acclaimed debut feature Save the Green Planet!. Playing an arrogant company executive—believed by the film's hero to be an alien from Andromeda Galaxy—Baek's performance won him a Best Actor Award from the 2003 Puchon International Fantastic Film Festival, as well as numerous best supporting actor mentions from local awards ceremonies. He quickly became sort of a cult figure among younger cinephiles.

Following on this success, Baek went on to appear in several more high-profile films, including a memorable role in Choi Dong-hoon's caper film The Big Swindle and a showstopping performance as intelligence chief Kim Jae-gyu in Im Sang-soo's controversial drama The President's Last Bang.

The year 2006 turned out to be a particularly prolific year for Baek, as he took leading and supporting roles in four films. (It was a profitable year as well, with his fee rising to $400,000 per film—just a shade below that of the top stars.) Of these four, Choi Dong-hoon's Tazza: The High Rollers proved to be a runaway hit, selling close to 7 million tickets.

In August 2021, Baek signed with new agency Fantagio.

Personal life
Baek divorced his wife in March 2004 after 27 years of marriage. His two sons, Baek Do-bin and Baek Seo-bin, are also actors.

Filmography

Film

Television

Awards and nominations

References

External links 
  
 
 
 

1947 births
Living people
Male actors from Seoul
South Korean male film actors
South Korean male television actors
South Korean male stage actors
Chung-Ang University alumni
20th-century South Korean male actors
21st-century South Korean male actors
Fantagio artists